Brome—Missisquoi (formerly known as Missisquoi) is a federal electoral district in Quebec, Canada, that has been represented in the House of Commons of Canada since 1925. The original electoral district of Missiquoi existed from 1867 to 1925.

Geography
This riding, in the south of the province, extends along the Canada–US border between Montreal and Sherbrooke, straddling the Quebec regions of Montérégie and Estrie. Its main towns are Cowansville, Magog, and Brome Lake.

The district includes the Regional County Municipality of Brome-Missisquoi, the municipalities of Saint-Sébastien, Henryville, Noyan, Clarenceville, Venise-en-Québec, Bromont, and the Regional County Municipality of Memphrémagog except Stanstead, Ayer's Cliff, North Hatley, Ogden, Sainte-Catherine-de-Hatley, Hatley and Stanstead Canton.

Its population in 2006 was 92,591 and the area is 3,045 km2.

The neighbouring ridings are Saint-Jean, Shefford, Richmond—Arthabaska, and Compton—Stanstead.

History
It was created in 1924 from parts of Brome, Iberville, Missisquoi and Saint-Jean ridings.

The electoral district was abolished in 1966 when it was redistributed between Missisquoi and Saint-Jean ridings.  In 1970, Missisquoi was renamed "Brome—Missisquoi".

In 1976, "Brome—Missisquoi" was abolished and became part of a new "Missisquoi riding", which was renamed "Brome—Missisquoi" in 1983.

The 2012 electoral redistribution saw this riding stay mostly the same, but it lost a small fraction of territory to Shefford.

Demographics

Members of Parliament

This riding has elected the following Members of Parliament. Its current MP is Pascale St-Onge of the Liberal Party.

Election results

Brome—Missisquoi, 1984 - present

|-

Note: Conservative vote is compared to the total of the Canadian Alliance vote and Progressive Conservative vote in 2000 election.

Missisquoi, 1979 - 1984

Brome—Missisquoi, 1972 - 1979

	

Note: Social Credit vote is compared to Ralliement créditiste vote in the 1968 election.

Missisquoi, 1968 - 1972

Brome—Missisquoi, 1925 - 1968

Note: Ralliement créditiste vote is compared to Social Credit vote in the 1963 election.

Note: Progressive Conservative vote is compared to "National Government" vote in 1940 election.

Note: "National Government" vote is compared to Conservative vote in 1935 election.

See also
 List of Canadian federal electoral districts
 Past Canadian electoral districts

References

Campaign expense data from Elections Canada
Riding history from the Library of Parliament:
(1924 - 1966)
(1966 - 1970)
(1970 - 1976)
(1976 - 1983)
(1983 - present)

Notes

Cowansville
Magog, Quebec
Quebec federal electoral districts
Brome-Missisquoi Regional County Municipality